Chermakavan is a village in the Dilijan Municipality of the Tavush Province of Armenia. In 1989 Armenians, deported from Azerbaijan, settled in the village.

References

External links 

Former populated places in Tavush Province